The 1981–82 Challenge Cup was the 81st staging of rugby league's oldest knockout competition, the Challenge Cup. Known as the State Express Challenge Cup for sponsorship reasons, the final was contested by Widnes and Hull F.C. at Wembley. The match ended as a draw, resulting in a replay being staged at Elland Road, which Hull won 18–9.

Preliminary round

First round

Second round

Third round

Semi finals

Final
Widnes returned to Wembley as defending champions, having won the Challenge Cup for the sixth time in their history in the previous year. 

Widnes led by eight points with 15 minutes of the game remaining, but Hull F.C. came back to draw the match 14–14, meaning the final would be replayed for the first time since 1954.

Replay

References

External links
Challenge Cup official website 
Challenge Cup 1981/82 results at Rugby League Project

Challenge Cup
Challenge Cup
1982 in Welsh rugby league